The 2006 WAC men's basketball tournament was held March 9–11 in the Lawlor Events Center in Reno, Nevada.  #21 Nevada, the host, won the title.

 did not participate.

Bracket

References

WAC men's basketball tournament
Tournament
WAC men's basketball tournament
WAC men's basketball tournament